The Trentino People's Party, previously the People's Political Union of Trentino (Unione Politica Popolare del Trentino), was a political party in Austria-Hungary, founded in 1904 in support of Italian minorites in Trentino. Its leader was Alcide De Gasperi.

History
In the 1911 Cisleithanian legislative election the PPT was the largest party in Trentino, after another victory in 1907.

In 1920, after the annexation of Trentino into Italy, the PPT was merged into the Italian People's Party.

Electoral results

Imperial Council

Regional Council

References

Defunct political parties in Austria
Political parties in Trentino
Christian democratic parties in Italy
Catholic political parties
Alcide De Gasperi